Gigi Ballista (1 December 1918 – 2 August 1980) was an Italian film and television actor. He appeared in 60 films between 1961 and 1980.

Life and career
Born in Florence, Ballista graduated in Law, then he started working as a PR consultant in the field of advertising and industrial documentaries. He debuted as an actor at a mature age in the early 1960s with some minor roles, but his breakout came in 1966 with a role of weight in  Pietro Germi's The Birds, the Bees and the Italians. 

Following the critical and commercial success of the film, Ballista decided to pursue a professional career as an actor, and he became, mainly thanks to his characteristic hoarse and dysphonic voice, one of the most recognizable character actors in Italian cinema and television.

Selected filmography

 A Day for Lionhearts (1961) - Il frate
 I maniaci (1964) - Count at the party (segment "l'hobby") (uncredited)
 The Dreamer (1965) - Medico
 The Birds, the Bees and the Italians (1966) - Giacinto Castellan
 How I Learned to Love Women (1966) - Sir Archibald
 Pleasant Nights (1966) - Luca di Montemerlo
 Sex Quartet (1966) - The Priest (segment "Fata Marta")
 The Seventh Floor (1967) - Dr. Claretta
 L'immorale (1967) - Don Michele
 L'Homme qui trahit la mafia (1967) - Aldo 
 Galileo (1968) - Trial Judge
 Torture Me But Kill Me with Kisses (1968) - Engineer
 Emma Hamilton (1968) - Le cardinal Ruffo
 Colpo di sole (1968)
 Fellini Satyricon (1969) - (uncredited)
 The Secret of Santa Vittoria (1969) - Padre Polenta
 Una storia d'amore (1970) - Borgognini
 Kill the Fatted Calf and Roast It (1970) - Il medico
 La califfa (1970) - Il principe industriale
 The Blonde in the Blue Movie (1971) - Commendatore Silvio Borellon
 Roma Bene (1971) - Vitozzi
 Trastevere (1971) - Il conte
 Non commettere atti impuri (1971) - Padre Spiridone
 Snow Job (1972)
 Beati i ricchi (1972) - Commendatore
 Black Turin (1972) - Marinotti
 Finalmente... le mille e una notte (1972) - Genie in lamp
 Giovannona Long-Thigh (1973) - Commendatore La Noce
 Crescete e moltiplicatevi (1973) - Dottore
 Blume in Love (1973) - Older Man
 La signora è stata violentata! (1973) - Carini
 Stregoni di città (1973)
 Brigitte, Laura, Ursula, Monica, Raquel, Litz, Florinda, Barbara, Claudia, e Sofia le chiamo tutte... anima mia (1974)
 Unbelievable Adventures of Italians in Russia (1974) - Dottore 
 Fischia il sesso (1974) - Mr. Lewis
 Claretta and Ben (1974) - Gino's Friend
 Stavisky (1974) - Gaston Henriet
 Sesso in testa (1974) - Father of Carletto
 Poker in Bed (1974) - Il commendator Gervasio Caminata
 Policewoman (1974) - L'avvocato
 Piange... il telefono (1975)
 Il vizio di famiglia (1975) - The Count
 The Sunday Woman (1975) - Vollero
 Mala, amore e morte (1975) - avv. Carlo Alberto Giorgi
 La banca di Monate (1975) - The Bishop
 Il giustiziere di mezzogiorno (1975) - Direttore Rossetti
 Il fratello (1975)
 La madama (1976) - Il Veneziano
 Confessions of a Lady Cop (1976) - Questore Moretti
 Salon Kitty (1976) - General
 La dottoressa sotto il lenzuolo (1976) - Prof. Ciotti
 Febbre da cavallo (1976) - Conte Dallara
 Un amore targato Forlì (1976)
 Cassiodoro il più duro del pretorio (1976)
 La compagna di banco (1977) - Girardi
 Midnight Express (1978) - Chief Judge
 Liquirizia (1979) - Bartolozzi
 I Hate Blondes (1980) - Psychiatrist
 L'assistente sociale tutto pepe (1981) - Bishop

References

External links

1918 births
1980 deaths
Italian male film actors
Actors from Florence
20th-century Italian male actors